Colobothea flavoguttata is a species of beetle in the family Cerambycidae. It was described by Per Olof Christopher Aurivillius in 1902 and is known from Brazil.

References

flavoguttata
Beetles described in 1902